St. Leo's Roman Catholic Church is a Catholic church in Toronto, Ontario, Canada. It is located on Royal York Road (formerly Church Street) at Stanley, in the Mimico neighbourhood, part of Etobicoke. It is the oldest Catholic church in Etobicoke and the only Catholic church in Mimico.

History

First church
The first services were held at Eden Court (515 Royal York Rd) the home of Mr Edward Stock, one of only three remaining Victorian Houses on Royal York with St. Leo's Rectory, the building has recently been declared a historic building.  Mr. Stock donated land for the original church in 1895 which opened as a mission of Holy Family in 1903.

In 1909 St. Leo's became a parish serving Swansea south of the College St extension (now Morningside Ave) and Mimico with its original boundaries:  Lake Ontario, the Humber River, North Queen St (now Delroy Dr) and Mimico Ave (now Kipling Ave).  One of ten famous races run between athletes Tom Longboat and Alf Shrubb took place for St. Leo's parish picnic at an old Mimico park in 1912 the same year St. Leo's extensively extended the church, doubling its capacity.  St. Leo's casualties for the First World War were 1 killed (Pte. Ed Doherty), 5 wounded out of 30 enlisted.  In 1920 the former western portion of Mimico became the Town of New Toronto, leading in 1924 to the building of St. Teresa's Catholic Church and the separation of this area from St. Leo's.  In 1923 the Town of Mimico had opened a second Public school and in 1926 the parish built St. Leo Elementary School across from the church on land bought from Mimico's Werden family which led to the creation of the Mimico Separate School Board which often met at the old Rectory, 48 Station Rd across from the Mimico Library.  St. Leo Elementary School is the oldest Separate School in Etobicoke still open.  Like the Town of Mimico and its other churches, St. Leo's went deeply into debt during the Great Depression. With much post war Italian immigration to the northern half of Mimico, in 1947 the Mimico Separate School Board opened a second Catholic school for the parish north of the QEW; St. Louis Elementary School the name likely suggested by the name of the pastor at the time (the first Italian-speaking pastor) Fr. Louis Markle.  All of St. Leo's early clergy served at the mother church of Holy Family (except Fr. Markle, whose brother Fr. Basil Markle served there).  All the early pastors but the first (Fr. Doherty) taught at St. Augustine's Seminary, a tradition carried on by the current pastor.

Second church
A new church was built across the street from the old in 1953 on the site of Mimico's 1858 post office.  Shortly after, the parish made a concerted effort to buy the next door Postmaster's Home, Werden House, to be the new rectory.  In 1955 St. Mark's Catholic Church was built in Humber Bay neighbourhood and in 1961 Holy Angels was built for The Queensway neighbourhood, the area having been cut off from Mimico by the building of the Queen Elizabeth Way.  After liturgical changes in the Latin Rite led to the use of the vernacular (English) in place of Latin, St. Leo's began providing a separate liturgy for Italian parishioners.  In 1960 a Parish Hall was built on the site of the Old Church.  Both elementary schools were extensively added to throughout the 1960s as Mimico was amalgamated with Etobicoke, St. Leo's parish replacing Our Lady of Sorrows Roman Catholic Church, Kingsway as the oldest Catholic parish in Etobicoke.  After full funding for Catholic Schools was introduced, the Public Board of Education offered the old Mimico High School to the Separate (Catholic) School Board which declined on the grounds that demographics changes in Etobicoke meant Mimico was no longer centrally located.

Four St. Leo's parishioners have received the Sacrament of Holy Orders:  Fr. Jim Passery (ordained in the church on the 50th anniversary of the parish), Deacon Ralph Yearsley, Deacon Gord Weiss, and Deacon Alan Morris.  One of St. Leo's most celebrated former parishioners is NHL Hockey Player Brendan Shanahan.  St. Leo's is also home to the Fourth Lakeshore Beavers, Cubs and Scouts.

Pastors 

 Rev Msgr Jim Coyle (1903–1909) Commuted from Holy Family, Toronto (Parkdale)
 Rev. George Doherty (1909–1929) First Pastor, bought old rectory at 48 Station Rd.
 Rev. Msgr. Edward Brennan (1929–1936) Became Rector of St. Augustine's Seminary
 Rev. Msgr. John Corrigan (1936–1946) Taught at St. Augustine's Seminary
 Rev. Dr. Louis Markle (1946–1970) Taught at St. Augustine's Seminary.  Built new church, Bought new Rectory, Pastor during liturgical reforms in the Latin Rite. Dr. Markle died shortly after retiring from St. Leo's.
 Rev. Marshall Beriault (1970–1979) Assistant from 1967, brought Cursillo movement to Canada
 Rev. Thomas Cullen (1979–1994) Died shortly after retiring from St. Leo's.
 Rev. Joseph Sultana (1994–2006) Became Pastor at St. Aidan's Roman Catholic Church in Agincourt, Scarborough
 Rev. Giuliano Costato (2006–2007)
 Rev. Frank Carpinelli (2007–2021) Teaches at St. Augustine's Seminary
 Rev. Nick Defina (2021- )

'Children' Parishes 
 St. Teresa, New Toronto Founded 1924
 St. Mark, Humber Bay Founded 1955
 Holy Angels, Queensway Founded 1961

Schools 
St. Leo Elementary Founded 1926
St. Louis Elementary Founded 1947

See also
Mimico
Holy Family, Toronto (Parkdale)
Roman Catholic Archdiocese of Toronto

Notes

External links
http://www.catholicregister.org/content/view/2441/849/

Roman Catholic Archdiocese of Toronto
Roman Catholic churches in Toronto
Etobicoke
Roman Catholic churches in Ontario